Pristimantis vinhai is a species of frog in the family Strabomantidae.
It is endemic to Brazil.
Its natural habitat is tropical moist lowland forests.
It is threatened by habitat loss.

References

vinhai
Endemic fauna of Brazil
Amphibians of Brazil
Amphibians described in 1975
Taxonomy articles created by Polbot